The 1891–92 season was the third in existence for Sheffield United.  This was their first season playing in the recently formed Northern League as the club sought to establish itself as a major footballing force.  The Blades had a reasonably successful season, finishing third in the league, and registering some comprehensive victories along the way.  They improved on the previous season by reaching the second round proper of the FA Cup and were victorious in the local cup competitions, winning both the Sheffield Challenge Cup and the Wharncliffe Charity Cup for the first time.

Under the stewardship of Joseph Wostinholm, United continued to recruit more experienced players. Bob Cain was signed from Bootle and Harry Hammond arrived from Everton, both players cementing their place in United's first team for several years to come.  Most significant however was the emergence of a young Ernest Needham who made his United debut in the early part of the season and would go on to be one of the club's greatest ever players and ultimately captain England.  The season did see the first United players to gain international caps with both Harry Lilley and Michael Whitham appearing for England on 5 March, (although in different matches as England played two different games concurrently on that day.)

Background
Football was developing and match referees were introduced for the first time for the 1891–92 season.  Previously both sides had provided an umpire who jointly officiated the game and consulted with a third official should they be unable to agree.  Penalty kicks were also introduced to penalise fouls made within eighteen yards of the goal, and United used nets in the goals at Bramall Lane for the first time.

The previous season had been a mixed one, with an improvement in the quality of players and increasing attendances for home games, but a mid–table finish in the Midland Counties League had been the result.  Under the guidance of club secretary J.B. Wostinholm, the football committee still wanted to improve the standard of matches played by United and so opted to leave the Midland Counties League and seek election to The Football League instead.  They were unsuccessful in their attempt, amidst accusations that local rivals The Wednesday had voted against their acceptance and had even petitioned other clubs to vote against their entry.  Instead United joined the newly formed Northern League which comprised mainly teams from the north–east, meaning that their nearest away match in the league was at Darlington, some 85 miles away from Sheffield.

Despite now being focussed on league football, the club also arranged a large number of friendly fixtures throughout the season which resulted in a congested fixture list and United playing 75 first team games in the space of eight months.  This season also saw the introduction of an official reserve side for United, dubbed The Sheffield Strollers, who played a number of fixtures in addition to those played by the first team.

Kit
United dropped the thin red vertical stripes that had been introduced the previous season, reverting to a plain white shirt along with blue shorts and socks.  This season saw the introduction of a club crest (or badge) on the shirts for the first time, utilising a red heraldic shield emblazoned with three sheaves of wheat and a lions head, along with the letters SUFC.

Season overview

Northern League
United continued with a sizable turnover of playing staff but were now focusing on using their financial position to target experienced professionals rather than relying on the untried talents of previous seasons.  Bob Cain and Harry Hammond arrived in August, recruited from Bootle and Everton respectively, while previous stalwarts like Edward Cross, Billy Bridgewater and W. Robertson were allowed to leave.  A young Ernest Needham was promoted to the first team and began to feature regularly as the season progressed; he would eventually go on to make over 450 league appearances for the Blades and to captain England during his career.

The league season started well as United registered a 4–2 away victory over Sunderland Albion followed by two comprehensive home wins; beating Darlington 7–1 and South Bank 6–0.  It was not until early November that the Blades dropped points, suffering a 3–0 home defeat by Middlesbrough before a 2–0 reverse at the hands of struggling Darlington.

United continued to add to the squad, signing keeper Will Lilley from Staveley, before registering a string of victories until the end of the year, culminating in a 6–0 win over Stockton at the end of December.  The league then took a winter break of almost three months, not resuming until almost the end of March.  The club continued to strengthen their attacking options by recruiting three additional forwards from Scotland; Sandy Wallace, John Scott and resigning former player James Duncan.  William Calder and Harry Munro were both allowed to join Gainsborough Trinity, before United resumed their league campaign with a 4–3 loss away at Newcastle West End who were struggling at the bottom of the table.  This signalled a down–turn in form and inconsistent results until the end of the season meant that United lost touch with the top of the table and eventually finished third.

United's growing reputation was such that their players were beginning to come to the attention of the FA and both Michael Whitham and Harry Lilley received an England call–up in March 1892.  Both players made their debut on 5 March, Whitham in a Home Championship game against Ireland in Belfast, and Lilley in a friendly against Wales.

The club's organising football committee were still determined to gain entry to The Football League and applied for election for the second year in succession.  On this occasion however United were successful and were given entry into the newly formed Second Division for the 1892–93 season.  Cross–town rivals The Wednesday had also been accepted into the Football League, but had been placed in the First Division, much to the annoyance of United's board of directors.  United asked to review the ballot papers upon which this decision had been based but were told that they had been destroyed, angering the club's directors still further.

FA Cup
As in previous years United had to play a number of qualifying rounds against local opposition before they gained entry to the FA Cup proper.  Lincoln City were dispatched 4–1 at Bramall Lane, before much closer games against Grimsby and Gainsborough Trininty saw the Blades reach the first round proper.  United travelled to Blackpool in the First Round, coming away comfortable 3–0 winners to secure a place in Round Two for only the second time. They met an experienced Wolverhampton Wanderers side at Molineux Stadium but were to progress no further, losing 3–1 to their Midlands opponents.

Local cups
As football in the area developed, so the standing of the local cups diminished amongst the area's leading sides.  United entered the Sheffield Challenge Cup at the third round stage and comfortably saw off Doncaster Rovers 4–0 at Bramall Lane.  The semi-final saw an away trip to Kilnhurst, who the Blades beat by the same 4–0 scoreline to secure a place in the final for the second year in succession.  United faced local rivals The Wednesday at Bramall Lane, but the opposition had fielded their reserve side during the competition and as such a largely second–string United side beat the Wednesday Wanderers 2–1 to lift the club's first ever trophy.

The Wharncliffe Charity Cup garnered even less attention this season and United were given an automatic place in the final where they faced Attercliffe at the Olive Grove ground, beating them 2–0 at the end of March to win their second trophy in a month.

Friendlies
As in the previous two seasons, the football committee filled the fixture list by arranging a large number of friendlies and exhibition games throughout the year. The results of these games were mixed and mirrored the team's performance in the league; starting promisingly in the Autumn but tailing off after the turn of the year.  United began the programme well, gaining victories against emerging Woolwich Arsenal, and the established Notts County and Bolton Wanderers, in the early part of the season.  From October onwards the results became less consistent with the Blades suffering heavy defeats at the hands of Grimsby Town and Birmingham St. George's.  It wasn't until February that United's form improved, beating Burnley and Everton twice in consecutive games, running out 5–0 victors over the Merseyside club at Bramall Lane.  Another run of poor results followed until the Blades registered their most comprehensive victory of the season at the end of March, beating Burnley 8–1.

For the second season in succession the highlights of the fixture list were the games against local rivals The Wednesday, with a record 22,900 supporters attending Bramall Lane to see the Blades record a 5–0 victory at the end of October. Just under a month later United lost the return fixture at Olive Grove 4–1 in front of a more modest crowd of just under 12,000.

Squad
Source:

First team

Players leaving before the end of the season

Transfers

In

Out

League table

Squad statistics

Appearances and goals

|-
|colspan="10"|Players who left before the end of the season:

|}

Results
Source:

Key

Northern League

FA Cup

Sheffield Challenge Cup

Wharncliffe Charity Cup

Friendlies

Notes
Source:

Bibliography

References

External links
 Sheffield United F.C. Official Website

Sheffield United F.C. seasons
Sheffield United